Budu may refer to:

Languages
 Budu language, a language of the Democratic Republic of the Congo
 Budu Dogon, a language of Mali
 Budu language (China), a language of China

Other uses 
 Budu people, an ethnic group of the Democratic Republic of the Congo
 Budu (sauce), a fish sauce
 Budu Cantemir, a village in Romania